Brinsmead is a suburb of Cairns in the Cairns Region, Far North Queensland, Australia.

Geography 

History 
Brinsmead is situated in the Yidinji traditional Aboriginal country.
The suburb takes its name from the Brinsmead Gap, a topographical feature between the hills of the Whitfield Range, in turn named after Horace George Brinsmead, a sugar plantation owner at Freshwater who guided groups to see the Barron Falls, one of the first tourism ventures in the district.

Amenities 
Freshwater Christian College is located in Brinsmead.

References

External links 

Towns in Queensland
Suburbs of Cairns
1975 establishments in Australia
Populated places established in 1975